Heritiera littoralis, commonly known as the looking-glass mangrove or tulip mangrove, is a mangrove tree in the family Malvaceae native to coastal areas of eastern Africa, Asia, Melanesia and northern Australia. The common name refers to the silvery appearance of the underside of the leaves, resembling a mirror to some degree. The strong timber has uses in marine applications and elsewhere.

Description
It is usually low-branching and the crown is untidy-looking with gnarled branches. The trunk is light grey or grey-brown in appearance, smooth when young but developing vertical fissures as it ages. 

They are oblong-elliptical to ovate-elliptical, dark green on the upper surface and the undersides are silvery-white to light brown due to the presence of stellate scales. 

The inflorescences are axillary panicles, and as this species is monoecious, they bear both pistillate (functionally female) and staminate (functionally male) flowers on the same plant. The flowers have a fused perianth tube with usually 5 teeth and are bell-shaped (hence the common name Tulip oak).

The fruit is a flattened, ellipsoid, indehiscent, brown woody pod which is derived from the carpel, and contains a single seed. The fruit can float for several weeks and so is able to take advantage of tides, currents and winds to aid in its dispersal.

Taxonomy
This species was first described by the  Scottish botanist William Aiton in 1789, who at the time was the director of the botanical garden at Kew. The description was published in the third volume of his work Hortus Kewensis, in which he also raised the genus Heritiera.

Subspecies
The Global Biodiversity Information Facility recognises two infraspecies, Heritiera littoralis subsp. littoralis, and Heritiera littoralis subsp. fischeri, while Plants of the World Online does not recognise any.

Etymology
The genus name Heritiera was given in honour of the French botanist Charles Louis L'Héritier de Brutelle. The species epithet litoralis means "by the sea" in reference to the habitat of this plant.

Vernacular names
Regional common names for the tree include:

Distribution and habitat
Heritiera littoralis'''s natural range is eastern Africa, Madagascar, India, Southeast Asia, Melanesia and the Northern Territory and Queensland in Australia. It grows in the landward edges of mangrove forests and along riverine forests at elevations close to sea level.

The Sundarbans, the largest mangrove forest in the world, is located in the southern areas of Bangladesh and the Indian state of West Bengal, where the plant is widely distributed. The forest covers 6017 square kilometers of land in total, including 1874 square kilometers of river areas. The forest is surrounded by the Gulf of Bengal in the south and by polders and farmland in the north. The forest is dense, and the greatest ground height is 3 meters above mean sea level.

Ecology
This species is host for the larvae of a number of lepidopterans including: Arhopala micale, Arhopala pseudocentaurus, Assara seminivale, Hymenoptychis sordida and Synnympha perfrenis.

Uses
The tree is harvested for timber and is valued for its toughness, durability, and resistance to saltwater. It is commonly used in shipbuilding and for pilings, bridges, wharves, furniture and housing. When sufficiently straight and high, the trunk has been used for ship's masts.

The fruit of species in the genus is used in Philippine cuisine to neutralize the fishy taste in kinilaw, a local dish of raw fish in vinegar or citrus juices. Another species used this way is the fruits of the tabon-tabon tree (Atuna excelsa subsp. racemosa, syn. Atuna racemosa).

The plant is widely used by locals and alternative medicines to treat diabetes, hepatic illnesses, gastrointestinal disorders, goiter, and skin diseases, which is a sign that it has applications in traditional folk medicine. Several researches have revealed that the plant possesses significant anti-inflammatory, anti-hyperglycemic, antibacterial, anticancer, antioxidant, and antinociceptive activities. Studies in phytochemistry have led to the discovery of saponins, alkaloids, glycosides, tannins, steroids, flavonoids, gums, phytosterols, and reducing sugars.

H. littoralis extracts are used to treat dysentery and diarrhea. The leaves and stems were traditionally used to treat diarrhea and dysentery. Fish poison, arrowhead poison, and spearhead poison are just a few of the several poisons that have been discovered in the sap. In the Nicobar and Andaman islands, the plant's leaves and seeds are regarded as edible. Twigs can also be used to wash teeth and make chewing gum.

Gallery

References

External links
 
 
 View a map of recorded sightings of Heritiera littoralis at the Global Biodiversity Information Facility
 View observations of this species on iNaturalist
 See images of Heritiera littoralis'' on Flickriver

littoralis
Mangroves
Flora of tropical Asia
Flora of China
Flora of Australia
Flora of the Pacific
Flora of Africa
Taxa named by William Aiton
Taxa described in 1789
Western Indo-Pacific flora
Central Indo-Pacific flora